Fred Scotchbrook (April 1886 – 1959) was an English football player and manager, who managed Stockport County and Wolverhampton Wanderers.

External links

References
 

1886 births
1959 deaths
People from Horwich
English footballers
English football managers
English Football League players
Horwich F.C. players
Bolton Wanderers F.C. players
Stockport County F.C. managers
Wolverhampton Wanderers F.C. managers
Association footballers not categorized by position